Chemo is a prefix meaning chemical and commonly used as an abbreviation for chemotherapy.

Chemo may also refer to:

People
 Chemo (musician), an English musician now known as Forest DLG
 Chemo Soto, a Puerto Rican politician 
 José del Solar, nicknamed "Chemo",  a Peruvian retired footballer who played as a defensive midfielder, and a current coach

Arts, entertainment, and media
 Chemo (album), or The Chemo, an album working title used by Busta Rhymes
 Chemo (character), a supervillain comics character
 Blondell Wayne Tatum, a recurring character in novels by Carl Hiaasen, nicknamed "Chemo" for his grotesque appearance
 Chemo Hero, a song by Dolly Parton

See also
 
 Chem (disambiguation)